Saumur station (French: Gare de Saumur), also known as Saumur-Rive-Droite is a railway station serving the town Saumur, Maine-et-Loire department, western France. It is situated on the Tours–Saint-Nazaire railway.

History 
The station opened on 20 December 1848.  In 2008 the station served 673,735 passengers.  The station was refurbished from 2010 to 2011.

Services

The following services currently call at Saumur:
Intercity services (Intercités) Nantes - Saint-Pierre-des-Corps - Bourges - Lyon
Regional services (TER Pays de la Loire) Angers - Saumur - Tours
Regional services (TER Pays de la Loire) La Roche-sur-Yon - Bressuire - Saumur - Tours
Regional services (TER Centre-Val de Loire) Nantes - Angers - Saumur - Tours - Blois - Orléans

References

Railway stations in Maine-et-Loire
TER Pays de la Loire
TER Centre-Val de Loire
Railway stations in France opened in 1848